The 2014 NCAA Division I Men's Golf Championship was a golf tournament contested from May 23–28, 2014 at the Prairie Dunes Country Club in Hutchinson, Kansas. It was the 76th NCAA Division I Men's Golf Championship. The tournament was hosted by Wichita State University. The Alabama Crimson Tide won their second consecutive championship.

Regional qualifying tournaments
The five teams with the lowest team scores qualified from each of the six regional tournaments for both the team and individual national championships.
The lowest scoring individual not affiliated with one of the qualified teams in their regional also qualified for the individual national championship.

Venue

This is the first NCAA Division I Men's Golf Championship held at the Prairie Dunes Country Club in Hutchinson, Kansas, located about an hour north of Wichita. This is the second time the tournament has been hosted by Wichita State University; the last time the Shockers hosted was in 1963.

Team competition

Leaderboard
Par, single-round: 280
Par, total: 840

Source:

Remaining teams: California (850), Georgia (850), Texas (851), Oregon (852), Washington (853), Oklahoma (854), Vanderbilt (854), Arkansas (857), Kentucky (857), Missouri (859), UAB (862), Georgia State (863), Auburn (866), Florida State (870), Iowa State (871), Kennesaw State (872), Purdue (873), Virginia Tech (876), Texas A&M (881), Southern California (889)

Match play bracket
The eight teams with the lowest total scores after the first three rounds of play advanced to the match play bracket.

Individual competition
Par, single-round: 70
Par, total: 210*

Source:
* Originally scheduled for four rounds (72 holes), shortened to 54 holes due to weather delays.
^ Wilson won on third hole of sudden-death playoff.

References

NCAA Men's Golf Championship
Golf in Kansas
NCAA Division I Men's Golf Championship
NCAA Division I Men's Golf Championship
NCAA Division I Men's Golf Championship
NCAA Division I Men's Golf Championship